Sucker Free City is a 2004 television film directed by Spike Lee. The film examines white, black, and Chinese characters in San Francisco and the conflicts they encounter with each other.  The film was intended to be the pilot for a Showtime television series, but Showtime declined to pick up the series. The film was first screened at the Toronto International Film Festival and was subsequently broadcast on television on the Showtime Network. The title of the movie derives from "Sucka Free", a slang term in reference to the city often used by natives of Hunters Point and The Fillmore made popular by rappers San Quinn, JT the Bigga Figga (who has a cameo in the movie) and most notably the song "Sucka Free" from Rappin' 4-Tay's 1994 album Don't Fight the Feelin'.

Synopsis
The film follows three young men as they are drawn into lives of crime.  Nick (Crowley) uses his entry-level corporate job to commit credit card fraud and deals drugs on the side.  K-Luv (Mackie) is a member of the "V-Dubs" ("Visitacion Valley Mafia"), an African-American street gang.  Lincoln (Leung) is a rising figure in the Chinese mafia.

Gentrification forces Nick's family to move out of their home in the Mission District into Hunter's Point, where they are harassed by the V-Dubs.  K-Luv's side business of selling bootleg compact discs leads him to enlist Nick's help to bootleg CDs and to negotiate a truce with Lincoln.  Lincoln conducts an affair with his boss's daughter Angela (Carpio), a Stanford student engaged to a medical student classmate (Chung).

Cast

References

External links

San Francisco Chronicle article on the making of the film (Part 1)
San Francisco Chronicle article on the making of the film (Part 2)

2004 television films
2004 films
2004 drama films
Films directed by Spike Lee
Films scored by Terence Blanchard
Films about race and ethnicity
Films set in San Francisco
American gangster films
Hood films
Television films as pilots
Television pilots not picked up as a series
Triad films
2000s English-language films
2000s American films
2000s Hong Kong films
Bayview–Hunters Point, San Francisco